Saq (also Romanized as Sāq; also known as Sagh) is a village in Soleyman Rural District, Soleyman District, Zaveh County, Razavi Khorasan Province, Iran. At the 2006 census, its population was 5,171, in 1,255 families.

References 

Populated places in Zaveh County